The Frankfurt Universe are a German American football team from Frankfurt, Hesse.

The club, formed in 2007, won promotion to the German Football League 2, the second tier of league football in Germany, in 2011. The team rebranded itself as "Frankfurt Galaxy" ahead of the 2015 season and won promotion to the first division German Football League Süd (South) at the end of this season. It was renamed again as Frankfurt Universe in 2016.

History
Frankfurt Universe was formed in 2007, after the demise of the NFL Europa team Frankfurt Galaxy, by fans of the latter. Initially the club was hoping to use the Galaxy name but was prevented from this by the fact that the naming rights lay with the National Football League.

The Universe entered the tier five Landesliga Hessen in 2008, finished runners-up in the league and was promoted to the Oberliga for 2009. In the Oberliga the team remained unbeaten all season and moved up to the third tier Regionalliga Mitte, where it played in 2010 and 2011. The first season saw it finish fifth with an even record while, in the second year, it finished runners-up and won promotion.

From 2012 onwards the Universe played at national level in the southern division of the second tier German Football League 2. In its first two seasons the team finished runners-up behind the Allgäu Comets while, in 2014, it came third in the league.

In late 2014 the club announced that it had purchased the rights for the Galaxy name, would separate the first team from the club and field it under the Galaxy name and play from 2015 onwards in the Frankfurter Volksbank Stadion, home ground of association football team FSV Frankfurt. In the official 2015 table of the German Football League however the team is still listed as Frankfurt Universe. The team won the GFL 2 south in 2015 with a perfect season and nearly 400 points Touchdown-point differential and earned promotion to the GFL after the eighth placed GFL team, the Franken Knights, withdrew from the promotion/relegation round. 

In April 2016, Samsung were announced as the main sponsor of German Football League team Frankfurt Universe. Frankfurt lost the season opener to defending GFL South champion Schwäbisch Hall Unicorns in 2016.

Honours
The team's honours:
 German Bowl
 Runners-up: 2018
 Eurobowl
 Runners-up: (2) 2017, 2018
 EFL Bowl
 Champions: 2016
 BIG6 European Football League
 Participations: (2) 2017, 2018
 German Football League – Southern Division
 Runners-up: (4) 2016–2019
 League membership: (4) 2016–present
 German Football League 2 – Southern Division
 Champions: 2015
 Runners-up: 2012, 2013

German Bowl appearances
The club's appearances in the German Bowl:

 Champions in bold.

Eurobowl appearances
The club's appearances in the Eurobowl:

 Champions in bold.

Recent seasons
Recent seasons of the Universe:

 QF = Quarter finals
 SF = Semi finals
 GB = German Bowl

References

External links
  Official website
  Frankfurt Galaxy website 
  German Football League official website
  Football History Historic American football tables from Germany

American football in Hesse
German Football League teams
American football teams in Germany
American football teams established in 2007
2007 establishments in Germany
Universe